Jörg Bach (born 20 November 1965) is a German former professional footballer who played as a centre-back and a former manager.

References

1965 births
Living people
German footballers
Association football central defenders
SG Wattenscheid 09 players
Hamburger SV players
Fortuna Düsseldorf players
SV Eintracht Trier 05 players
Bundesliga players
2. Bundesliga players
Sportspeople from Koblenz
Footballers from Rhineland-Palatinate
West German footballers